Viacheslav Mikhailovich Aliabiev (5 February 1934 – 11 June 2009) was a Ukrainian professional footballer who won the Soviet Cup in 1961 and 1962 with Shakhtyor Stalino. He died of cancer on 11 June 2009, at the age of 75.

References

1934 births
2009 deaths
Deaths from cancer in Ukraine
Ukrainian footballers
Place of death missing
Association football defenders
FC Shakhtar Donetsk players
Sportspeople from Kursk